Gregory Charles Rivers (born 30 April 1965) is an Australian–Hong Kong actor.

Biography 
Rivers hails from Gympie, Queensland, and attended medical school at University of New South Wales, where he was friends with students from Hong Kong who introduced him to Cantopop. After discontinuing his medical degree, he moved to Hong Kong.
Two weeks after he landed, he ran into some band members of Alan Tam, whose driver he had been during a Sydney visit, and was invited to sing with him.

As a debutant with a modicum of Cantonese, Rivers auditioned and was chosen for a Caucasian role at Television Broadcasts Limited (TVB). Rivers adopted the Chinese name Ho Kwok-wing, the surname meaning River and the given name being that of his idol Leslie Cheung.  He went on to become TVB's staple stereotypical 'gweilo' (Caucasian) for two decades.

In 2005, Rivers appeared on stage beside Teresa Teng in an opera production.

In October 2007, Rivers was one of the four non-Chinese TV actors featured in an in-depth interview and feature story 'Hello Neighbour' in Muse, discussing his sense of cultural identity and how he saw his work.

Rivers' stint with TVB ended in 2008.

In a TV interview aired on 19 March 2007 on TVB, Rivers mentioned his reason for learning Cantonese was his association with Hong Kong Cantonese-speaking friends during his time at the University of New South Wales. It was this close friendship and the songs of Leslie Cheung that sparked his interest in learning the language.

Rivers has quipped that he was "TVB's token Caucasian for 20 years straight", having played many different stereotyped roles in more than 200 dramas for TVB. He is also a frequent YouTube poster, having his own prolific number of video clips of himself and his many colleagues within the Hong Kong media industry.

His performance of the song "Forever ATV", which made fun of the apparent government support for Asia Television (the doomed Hong Kong No. 2 broadcast television station that was then on the brink of collapse and finally to be stripped of its broadcasting licence and close its doors) was awarded "Hong Kong's most popular male singer 2015" at the satirical "TVMost 1st Guy Ten Big Ging Cook Gum Cook Awards Distribution" (TVMost's First Top Ten Wonderful Songs, Golden Songs Awards Ceremony) in January 2016.  His rendition of his own Cantonese rap song 香港地 (This Hong Kong) was welcomed as a defence of localism during difficult political times.

In 2017, Gregory was diagnosed with skin cancer after finding a swelling on the right side of his ear. He underwent surgery and has remained cancer-free to date. In 2018, he was diagnosed with arrhythmia.

Filmography

 TVB (1988–2008)
Twilight of a Nation (1988)
The Legend of Master Chan (1988)
The Justice of Life (1989)
Song Bird (1989)
Cherished Moments (1990)
Blood of Good and Evil (1990)
When Things Get Tough (1990)
It Runs in the Family (1990)
On The Edge (1991)
Man from Guangdong (1991)
The Hero from Shanghai (1993) (Cameo)
The Spirit of Love (1993) (Cameo)
Detective Investigation Files (1995)
The Criminal Investigator (1995)
The Criminal Investigator II (1996)
Old Time Buddy (1997)
Healing Hands (1998)
Face to Face (1999)
Armed Reaction II (2000)
Virtues of Harmony (2001)
Golden Faith (2002) (Cameo)
Family Man (2002)
Triumph in The Skies (2003)
Vigilante Force (2003)
The 'W' Files (2003)
Ups and Downs in the Sea of Love (2003)
To Get Unstuck in Time (2004)
Armed Reaction IV (2004)
A Handful of Love (2004)
To Catch The Uncatchable (2004)
Angels of Mission (2004)
The Gateau Affairs (2005)
Always Ready (2005)
Into Thin Air (2005)
War of In-Laws (2005)
Healing Hands III (2005)
The Prince's Shadow (2005)
Life Made Simple (2005)
La Femme Desperado (2006)
Under the Canopy of Love (2006)
C.I.B. Files (2006)
Bar Bender (2006)
Dicey Business (2006)
Life Art (2007)
War and Destiny (2007)
Phoenix Rising (2007)
The Brink of Law (2007)
The Ultimate Crime Fighter (2007)
Word Twisters' Adventures (2007)
A Journey Called Life (2008)
Forensic Heroes II (2008)

ViuTV (2016-) 

 Margaret and David - Green Bean (2016)
 Psycho Detective (2017)
 VR Exorcist (2018)
 If Love Was Not Timeless (2018)
 Reboot (2019)
 Movies
Legendary Couple (1995)
Floating City (2011)
Little Big Master (2015)
OCTB (2017)
My People, My Country  (2019) 
All U Need Is Love (2021)

References

External links
His personal website

HK cinemagic entry

1965 births
Hong Kong people of Australian descent
Australian male television actors
Hong Kong male television actors
Living people
TVB veteran actors
University of New South Wales alumni
People from Gympie